The Portuguese women's national under-19 football team represents Portugal in international youth association football competitions.

UEFA Women's Under-19 Championship
Portugal have qualified for one UEFA Women's Under-19 Championships with their performance being a semi-final finish in the UEFA Euro 2019. The team has never qualified for the FIFA U-20 Women's World Cup.

References

F
Youth football in Portugal
Women's national under-19 association football teams